Hillingdon is an area of Uxbridge within the London Borough of Hillingdon, centred 14.2 miles (22.8 km) west of Charing Cross. It was an ancient parish in Middlesex that included the market town of Uxbridge. During the 1920s the civil parish bore a rapid, planned increase in population and housing, and was absorbed by Uxbridge Urban District in 1929. It has formed part of Greater London since 1965.

Much of Hillingdon has lasting, albeit minor, administrative effect as the current Hillingdon East ward for electing councillors to Hillingdon London Borough Council. In November 2010, the ward had a recorded population of 12,403.

History

Toponymy
The name Hillingdon appears in the Domesday Book (1086) as Hillendone, possibly meaning "hill of a man named Hille". The name could also mean 'hill of a woman named Hilda'.

Local government
Hillingdon was an ancient parish, and had within it the chapelry of Uxbridge, which became a separate civil parish in 1866. When a local board of health was created for Uxbridge, the western part of Hillingdon parish was included within it. Under the Local Government Act 1894, Hillingdon parish was divided in two along the boundary of the board of health district. Hillingdon West became, with Uxbridge, part of the Uxbridge Urban District. Hillingdon East, now governed by the Hillingdon East Parish Council, became part of the Uxbridge Rural District. Uxbridge Rural District and the parish council were abolished in 1928, with the Hillingdon East parish being added to the Uxbridge Urban District. Both Hillingdon East and Hillingdon West parishes were abolished in 1938 and added to Uxbridge parish. In 1965, under the London Government Act 1963, Hillingdon became the name of the westernmost borough of Greater London.

Urban development
The A40 (Western Avenue) was rerouted in the early 1990s to run slightly north of its original route, thereby allowing traffic to flow without interruption at the junction of Hillingdon Circus. Hillingdon tube station was required to be demolished in order for the new road to be constructed, and a new station was opened further south along the line in 1994, winning the Underground Station of the Year award for that year.

Parliamentary constituency
Hillingdon is a traditional Conservative stronghold lying within the Uxbridge and South Ruislip constituency, represented since 2015 by Boris Johnson. Before that, John Randall MP had represented the constituency since 1997, following the death of fellow Conservative Sir Michael Shersby.

Education
Primary schools in Hillingdon include Oak Farm Juniors, St Bernadette's Roman Catholic Primary School, St Helen's College, Hillingdon Primary and Ryefield Primary.

Secondary schools, ACS Hillingdon, Bishopshalt School, Oak Wood School, Vyners School and Swakeleys School for Girls.

Moorcroft School in Colham Green is a special school, run by the Eden Academy Trust. It was formerly located at Moorcroft Park on Harlington Road, the old Moorcroft House hospital site.

Transport
Hillingdon tube station is served by the Metropolitan and Piccadilly lines of the London Underground.

West Ruislip tube station is served by the Central line of the London Underground.

The Oxford Tube and Oxford X90 services between Oxford and central London also serve Hillingdon.

Bus route U2 serves Hillingdon, operating between Uxbridge station and Brunel University.

Bus route A10 connects Uxbridge to Heathrow Central Bus Station.

Landmarks

Church of St John the Baptist

The church of St John the Baptist stands at the top of Hillingdon Hill, at its junction with Royal Lane. It was built in 1629, replacing an earlier building deemed to have become unsafe. In 1846, the architect George Gilbert Scott (father of George Gilbert Scott Junior) was asked to design an extension, as the increasing population meant the church was becoming too cramped. This extension was completed between 1847 and 1848 by the Fassnidge builders from Uxbridge.

On 8 November 1940, a bomb fell on the south side of the church, damaging many of the windows on the south and east sides of the church. The windows were repaired after the war. The barrel roof of the chancel was renovated in 1953 to commemorate the coronation of Elizabeth II. In 1964, a vestry was built on the north-eastern side of the church. There is a notable brass on the north wall of the south aisle dedicated to John, 8th Baron Strange of Knokin and his wife Jacquetta (1509). The nearest station to the church is Uxbridge which is at the distance of 1.73 km.

Hillingdon Court

Hillingdon Court was built in 1858 by Sir Charles Mills as his family home, after he had bought separate adjacent properties in Vine Lane. Both buildings were demolished and the plots combined to allow the construction of the new property. The mansion remained in the family's ownership until Charles Mills, 2nd Baron Hillingdon died in 1919. Part of the estate was bought by the local authority, while the mansion was bought by the Roman Catholic Order of the Sacred Heart and became a nursing home in 1920. After the Second World War, the mansion became a girls' school, and in 1978 it was bought by ACS International Schools to become ACS Hillingdon. Under the ownership of ACS International Schools, the mansion has been extended and converted in parts to meet the needs of a school. The area of land bought by the local authority remains today as Hillingdon Court Park.

Notable people

 Actor Michael Anderson Jr., was born in Hillingdon
 Writer A. M. Burrage (1889–1956) was born in Hillingdon
 Comedian James Corden was born in Hillingdon
 Actress Lynne Frederick (1954–1994) was born in Hillingdon
 Actor Denis Gilmore was born in Hillingdon
 Kwame Kwei-Armah was born in Hillingdon
 Conductor and composer Eugene Goossens (1893–1962) lived in Hillingdon
 Actor Huw Higginson was born in Hillingdon
 Actress Elspeth March (1911–1999) lived in Hillingdon
 Comic actor and comedian Alfred Marks (1921–1996) lived in Hillingdon
 Screenwriter and film director Simon Monjack (1970–2010) was born in Hillingdon
 Claire Richards was born in Hillingdon and attended Bishopshalt School
 Meinhardt Schomberg (1641–1719) built and lived in Hillingdon House
 Actor and director Tony Tanner was born in Hillingdon
 Actress Heather Thatcher (1896–1987) lived in Hillingdon at the time of her death
 Footballer Ray Wilkins was born in Hillingdon
 Musician Ronnie Wood was born in Hillingdon
 Footballer Glenn Hoddle was born in Hillingdon

See also

 Hillingdon Heath
 2010 Hillingdon Council election
 Elthorne Hundred
 UB postcode area

References
Citations

Works cited
 

Further reading

External links

 London Borough of Hillingdon
 The Parade c.1960, Hillingdon – Francis Frith
 Uxbridge Lido – now Hillingdon Sports and Leisure Complex

Areas of London
Districts of the London Borough of Hillingdon
Places formerly in Middlesex